SCM Râmnicu Vâlcea, formerly known as CS Oltchim Râmnicu Vâlcea, is a professional women's handball club in Râmnicu Vâlcea, Romania, that competes in the Liga Naţională and the EHF European League. 

It holds the record of CS Oltchim Râmnicu Vâlcea since 26 April 2019, this means SCM Râmnicu Vâlcea is the successor club. The board also plans to get the name in the future.

Club crest

Kits

Honours

Domestic

League
 Liga Națională  
 Champions (20): 1989, 1990, 1991, 1993, 1994, 1995, 1996, 1997, 1998, 1999, 2000, 2002, 2007, 2008, 2009, 2010, 2011, 2012, 2013, 2019
 Runners-up (5): 1983, 1985, 1992, 2001, 2003
 Third place (7): 1984, 1986, 1988, 2005, 2006, 2021, 2022

Cup
 Cupa României
 Winners (14): 1984, 1990, 1992, 1993, 1994, 1995, 1996, 1997, 1998, 1999, 2001, 2002, 2007, 2011, 2020
 Runners-up (6): 1986, 2003, 2006, 2018, 2019, 2022
 Third place (3): 1987, 1988, 1989
 Supercupa României
 Winners (4): 2007, 2011, 2018, 2020
 Runners-up (1): 2019

European 
EHF Champions League
 Runners-up (1): 2010
 Third place (5): 1990, 1992, 2009, 2012, 2013
 EHF Champions Trophy
 Winners (1): 2007  
 EHF Super Cup
 Winners (1): 1984 
 EHF Cup
 Winners (2): 1984, 1989    
 EHF Cup Winners' Cup
 Winners (1): 2007
 Runners-up (1): 2002
 Third place (5): 1987, 1993

Kit manufacturers and sponsors

European record

Team

Current squad  
Squad for the season 2022–23

Goalkeepers 
 1  Daciana Hosu
 26  Isabell Roch
 77  Sara Rus
Wingers 
LW
 3  Elin Hansson 
 22  Cristina Florica (c) 
RW
 7  Yevgenia Levchenko
 27  Asuka Fujita
Line players
 6  Asma Elghaoui
 8  Bobana Klikovac 
 9  Raluca Băcăoanu

Back players 
LB
 23  Iryna Glibko
 24  Jovana Kovačević
 92  Raluca Dăscălete
CB
 2  Andreea Ianăși
 5  Amalia Coman
 19  Daniela de Jong 
RB   
 17  Tanja Ašanin 
 18  Daria Bucur

Transfers
Transfers for the season 2023–24

 Joining
  Raluca Kelemen (GK) (from  SCM Gloria Buzău)
  Mia Zschocke (LB/CB) (from  Storhamar HE) 
  Rebeca Necula (CB) (from  CSM Slatina)
  Julia Maidhof (RB) (from  SG BBM Bietigheim)
  Alicia Gogîrlă (RB) (from  CSM București)
  Nathalie Hagman (RW) (from  Neptunes de Nantes)
  Nataša Ljepoja (LP) (from  RK Krim)

 Leaving
  Isabell Roch (GK) (to  Borussia Dortmund)
  Sara Rus (GK) (unknown destination) (?)
  Corina Lupei (LW) (to  HC Dunărea Brăila with immediate effect)
  Raluca Dăscălete (LB) (unknown destination) (?)
  Andreea Ianăși (CB) (unknown destination) (?)
  Amalia Coman (CB) (to  Minaur Baia Mare)
  Daria Bucur (RB) (to  SCM Gloria Buzău)
  Tanja Ašanin (RB) (to  Kastamonu Bld. GSK)
  Yvgenia Levchenko (RW) (unknown destination) 
  Bobana Klikovac (LP) (to  CSM Corona Brașov)
  Raluca Băcăoanu (LP) (retires)

Staff members 
  President: Florin Verigeanu
  Head Coach: Bent Dahl
  Assistant Coach: Daniela Joița
  Fitness Coach: Aleksandar Tunguz
  Masseur: Andrei Bularga, Robert Tănăsescu 
  Doctor: Carmen Udrea

Individual awards in the EHF Champions League

Notable former players   
 

  Carmen Amariei  
  Valentina Ardean-Elisei 
  Valeria Motogna-Beșe 
  Aurelia Brădeanu
  Mihaela Ciobanu
  Valentina Cozma  
  Luminița Dinu-Huțupan 
  Lidia Drăgănescu 
  Ramona Farcău 
  Simona Gogîrlă 
  Narcisa Lecușanu
  Sorina Lefter 
  Steluța Luca  
  Oana Manea 
  Edit Matei  
  Cristina Neagu 
  Adriana Nechita 
  Ionela Stanca  
  Mariana Tîrcă  
  Maria Török-Duca
  Paula Ungureanu
  Cristina Vărzaru 
  Alexandrina Barbosa
  Silvia Navarro   
  Marta López  
  Alicia Fernández 
  Mireya González 
  Yulia Managarova
   Regina Shymkute 
  Ekaterina Vetkova
  Olga Gorshenina  
  Katarina Bulatović 
  Marija Jovanović 
  Marta Batinović 
  Amandine Leynaud
  Allison Pineau
   Gabriella Szűcs 
   Rita Borbás 
  Kristina Liščević 
  Željka Nikolić
   Ann Grete Nørgaard
  Maren Nyland Aardahl
  Yeliz Özel
   Anastasia Pidpalova

Coaching history    
  Constantin Cojocaru 
  Ioan Gherhard
  Gheorghe Ionescu
  Bogdan Macovei  
  Alexandru Mengoni 
  Constantin Popescu Pilică
  Lucian Râșniță 
  Gheorghe Tadici (2006–2008)
  Mariana Tîrcă  
 Ivica Rimanić (2008–2009)
  Radu Voina (2009–2010; 2011–2012)
 Péter Kovács (2010–2011)
  Anja Andersen (2011)
  Jakob Vestergaard (2012–2013)
 Maria Török-Duca (2004–2005; 2013)
  Simona Gogîrlă (2013–2014)
 Dumitru Muși (2014–2015)
 Constantin Ștefan (2015–2016)
 Ghoerghe Sbora (2016–2017; 2018)
 Aurelian Roșca (2017–2018)
 Florentin Pera (2018–2021)
 Goran Kurteš  (2021)
 Bent Dahl  (2021-)

See also
Oltchim

References

External links 
 

Liga Națională (women's handball) clubs
Handball clubs established in 1973
1973 establishments in Romania
Râmnicu Vâlcea
Romanian handball clubs